Springfield Township is a township in Burlington County, in the U.S. state of New Jersey. As of the 2020 United States census, the township's population was 3,245, a decrease of 169 (−5.0%) from the 2010 census count of 3,414, which in turn reflected an increase of 187 (+5.8%) from the 3,227 counted in the 2000 census.

History 
Springfield was originally formed on November 6, 1688, and reformed by Royal charter on January 13, 1713. Springfield Township was incorporated by the Township Act of 1798 of the New Jersey Legislature on February 21, 1798, as one of New Jersey's initial group of 104 townships. Portions of the township were taken on December 2, 1723, to form New Hanover Township. The township's name derives from springs and brooks in the area.

Geography
According to the United States Census Bureau, the township had a total area of 29.57 square miles (76.58 km2), including 29.51 square miles (76.44 km2) of land and 0.06 square miles (0.15 km2) of water (0.19%).

Juliustown (2010 Census population of 429) is an unincorporated community and census-designated place (CDP) located entirely within Springfield Township, while Fort Dix (total population of 7,716 as of 2010) is a CDP located in parts of Springfield Township, New Hanover Township and Pemberton Township.

Other unincorporated communities, localities and place names located partially or completely within the township include Arneys Mount, Chambers Corner, Ellis, Folwell, Jacksonville, Jobstown, Pine Lane and Powell.

The township borders the Burlington County municipalities of Burlington Township, Chesterfield Township, Eastampton Township, Florence Township, Mansfield Township, North Hanover Township, Pemberton Township and Wrightstown.

The township is one of 56 South Jersey municipalities that are included within the New Jersey Pinelands National Reserve, a protected natural area of unique ecology covering , that has been classified as a United States Biosphere Reserve and established by Congress in 1978 as the nation's first National Reserve. Part of the township is included in the state-designated Pinelands Area, which includes portions of Burlington County, along with areas in Atlantic, Camden, Cape May, Cumberland, Gloucester and Ocean counties.

Demographics

2010 census

The Census Bureau's 2006–2010 American Community Survey showed that (in 2010 inflation-adjusted dollars) median household income was $85,417 (with a margin of error of +/− $13,463) and the median family income was $102,337 (+/− $14,017). Males had a median income of $62,813 (+/− $16,928) versus $47,361 (+/− $11,194) for females. The per capita income for the borough was $37,901 (+/− $4,219). About 2.6% of families and 3.4% of the population were below the poverty line, including 2.8% of those under age 18 and 1.4% of those age 65 or over.

2000 census
As of the 2000 United States census there were 3,227 people, 1,098 households, and 906 families residing in the township. The racial makeup of the township was 91.94% White, 3.22% African American, 0.31% Native American, 2.63% Asian, 0.22% from other races, and 1.67% from two or more races. Hispanic or Latino of any race were 1.77% of the population.

There were 1,098 households, out of which 36.7% had children under the age of 18 living with them, 73.4% were married couples living together, 5.8% had a female householder with no husband present, and 17.4% were non-families. 13.3% of all households were made up of individuals, and 5.4% had someone living alone who was 65 years of age or older. The average household size was 2.93 and the average family size was 3.22.

In the township the population was spread out, with 25.8% under the age of 18, 5.7% from 18 to 24, 29.0% from 25 to 44, 28.7% from 45 to 64, and 10.7% who were 65 years of age or older. The median age was 39 years. For every 100 females, there were 100.1 males.  For every 100 females age 18 and over, there were 97.7 males.

The median income for a household in the township was $69,268, and the median income for a family was $72,292. Males had a median income of $49,044 versus $31,392 for females. The per capita income for the township was $29,322.  About 2.8% of families and 3.6% of the population were below the poverty line, including 1.2% of those under age 18 and 8.5% of those age 65 or over.

Parks and recreation
Burlington County Fairgrounds (home of the annual Farm Fair) opened in 2011 at the intersection of Route 206 and Columbus-Jobstown Road.

Government

Local government 
Springfield Township operates within the Faulkner Act (formally known as the Optional Municipal Charter Law) under the Council-Manager form of municipal government, implemented by direct petition as of January 1, 2001, having been approved by voters in a November 1999 referendum. The township is one of 42 municipalities (of the 564) statewide that use this form of government. The Township Council is comprised of five members elected at-large in a partisan vote to four-year terms on a staggered basis, with either two or three seats coming up for election in even-numbered years as part of the November general election. At a reorganization meeting held during the first week of January following each election, the council selects a mayor and deputy mayor from among its members to serve two-year terms of office.

, members of the Springfield Township Council are Mayor Anthony Marinello (R, term on council and as mayor ends December 31, 2022), Deputy Mayor David Frank (R, term on council ends 2024; term as deputy mayor ends 2022), Andrew Eaton (R, 2024), Denis McDaniel (R, 2022) and Peter Sobotka (R, 2022).

Federal, state and county representation 
Springfield Township is located in the 3rd Congressional District and is part of New Jersey's 8th state legislative district.

 

Burlington County is governed by a Board of County Commissioners comprised of five members who are chosen at-large in partisan elections to serve three-year terms of office on a staggered basis, with either one or two seats coming up for election each year; at an annual reorganization meeting, the board selects a director and deputy director from among its members to serve a one-year term. , Burlington County's Commissioners are
Director Felicia Hopson (D, Willingboro Township, term as commissioner ends December 31, 2024; term as director ends 2023),
Deputy Director Tom Pullion (D, Edgewater Park, term as commissioner and as deputy director ends 2023),
Allison Eckel (D, Medford, 2025),
Daniel J. O'Connell (D, Delran Township, 2024) and 
Balvir Singh (D, Burlington Township, 2023). 
Burlington County's Constitutional Officers are
County Clerk Joanne Schwartz (R, Southampton Township, 2023)
Sheriff James H. Kostoplis (D, Bordentown, 2025) and 
Surrogate Brian J. Carlin (D, Burlington Township, 2026).

Politics
As of March 2011, there were a total of 2,380 registered voters in Springfield Township, of which 403 (16.9% vs. 33.3% countywide) were registered as Democrats, 1,268 (53.3% vs. 23.9%) were registered as Republicans and 707 (29.7% vs. 42.8%) were registered as Unaffiliated. There were 2 voters registered as either Libertarians or Greens. Among the township's 2010 Census population, 69.7% (vs. 61.7% in Burlington County) were registered to vote, including 90.5% of those ages 18 and over (vs. 80.3% countywide).

In the 2012 presidential election, Republican Mitt Romney received 1,071 votes here (57.5% vs. 40.2% countywide), ahead of Democrat Barack Obama with 743 votes (39.9% vs. 58.1%) and other candidates with 35 votes (1.9% vs. 1.0%), among the 1,864 ballots cast by the township's 2,453 registered voters, for a turnout of 76.0% (vs. 74.5% in Burlington County). In the 2008 presidential election, Republican John McCain received 1,086 votes here (56.7% vs. 39.9% countywide), ahead of Democrat Barack Obama with 773 votes (40.4% vs. 58.4%) and other candidates with 33 votes (1.7% vs. 1.0%), among the 1,914 ballots cast by the township's 2,371 registered voters, for a turnout of 80.7% (vs. 80.0% in Burlington County). In the 2004 presidential election, Republican George W. Bush received 1,083 votes here (60.5% vs. 46.0% countywide), ahead of Democrat John Kerry with 656 votes (36.6% vs. 52.9%) and other candidates with 30 votes (1.7% vs. 0.8%), among the 1,791 ballots cast by the township's 2,199 registered voters, for a turnout of 81.4% (vs. 78.8% in the whole county).

In the 2013 gubernatorial election, Republican Chris Christie received 932 votes here (72.9% vs. 61.4% countywide), ahead of Democrat Barbara Buono with 299 votes (23.4% vs. 35.8%) and other candidates with 23 votes (1.8% vs. 1.2%), among the 1,279 ballots cast by the township's 2,408 registered voters, yielding a 53.1% turnout (vs. 44.5% in the county). In the 2009 gubernatorial election, Republican Chris Christie received 960 votes here (63.1% vs. 47.7% countywide), ahead of Democrat Jon Corzine with 422 votes (27.7% vs. 44.5%), Independent Chris Daggett with 80 votes (5.3% vs. 4.8%) and other candidates with 25 votes (1.6% vs. 1.2%), among the 1,522 ballots cast by the township's 2,412 registered voters, yielding a 63.1% turnout (vs. 44.9% in the county).

Education 
The Springfield Township School District serves students in pre-kindergarten through sixth grade at Springfield Township School. As of the 2018–19 school year, the district, comprised of one school, had an enrollment of 226 students and 22.7 classroom teachers (on an FTE basis), for a student–teacher ratio of 10.0:1.

Public school students in seventh through twelfth grades attend the schools of the Northern Burlington County Regional School District, which also serves students from Chesterfield Township, Mansfield Township, North Hanover Township, along with children of military personnel based at Joint Base McGuire–Dix–Lakehurst. As of the 2018–19 school year, the high school district, comprised of two schools, had an enrollment of 2,190 students and 163.4 classroom teachers (on an FTE basis), for a student–teacher ratio of 13.4:1. The schools in the district (with 2018–19 enrollment data from the National Center for Education Statistics) are 
Northern Burlington County Regional Middle School with 811 students in grades 7–8 and
Northern Burlington County Regional High School with 1,348 students in grades 9–12. Both schools are in the Columbus section of Mansfield Township. Using a formula that reflects the population and the value of the assessed property in each of the constituent municipalities, taxpayers in Springfield Township pay 17.7% of the district's tax levy, with the district's 2013–2014 budget including $35.6 million in spending. The 7–12 district's board of education has nine members, who are elected directly by voters to serve three-year terms of office on a staggered basis, with three seats up for election each year. The nine seats on the regional district's board of education are allocated based on the population of the constituent municipalities, with one seat assigned to Springfield Township.

Students from Springfield Township, and from all of Burlington County, are eligible to attend the Burlington County Institute of Technology, a countywide public school district that serves the vocational and technical education needs of students at the high school and post-secondary level at its campuses in Medford and Westampton.

Transportation

The major limited access roads that traverse are the New Jersey Turnpike and Interstate 295, both in the western part of the township. No interchanges along these highways are located in the township, with the closest interchanges that are accessible are Exit 47 (along I-295) in neighboring Burlington Township and Exits 5, 6A and 6 (along the Turnpike) in neighboring Westampton, Florence and Mansfield townships, respectively.

State and U.S. routes include U.S. Route 206 that runs through the center and Route 68 in the eastern section. The major county routes that pass through are County Route 537 in the eastern part and County Route 545 also in the eastern part briefly.

There is no public transportation available in the township.

Points of interest
 Old Upper Springfield Friends Burying Ground – The cemetery and the accompanying meeting house were placed on both the New Jersey (state ID # 875) and the National Register of Historic Places (Reference # 79001479) in 1979.
 Columbus Farmers Market, on Route 206, is a regional commercial center.

Notable people

People who were born in, residents of, or otherwise closely associated with Springfield Township include:
 Reading Wood Black (1830–1867), founder of Uvalde County, Texas and the city of Uvalde, Texas
 Irving Fryar (born 1962), former NFL wide receiver
 Phil Haines (born 1950), New Jersey Superior Court judge who served in the New Jersey Senate from 2008 to 2010
 Reuben Moon (1847–1914), Congressman who represented 
 Thomas Newbold (1760–1823), member of the United States House of Representatives for New Jersey from 1807 to 1813
 Joe Ohl (1888–1951), MLB pitcher who played for the Washington Senators
 Daniel Trotter (1747–1800), furniture maker from Philadelphia, bought 12 acres of land in Springfield Townwhip in 1781 
 Barclay White (1821–1906), Superintendent of Indian Affairs during the administration of President Ulysses S. Grant
 Walter Livingston Wright (1872–1946), professor of mathematics and president of Lincoln University.

References

External links

Springfield Township website

 
1688 establishments in New Jersey
Faulkner Act (council–manager)
Populated places established in 1688
Populated places in the Pine Barrens (New Jersey)
Townships in Burlington County, New Jersey